The European Charter of Local Self-Government was adopted under the auspices of the Congress of the Council of Europe and was opened for signature by the Council of Europe's member states on 15 October 1985. All Council of Europe member states are parties to the Charter. New member states of the Council of Europe are expected to ratify the Charter at the earliest opportunity.

The Charter commits the ratifying member states to guaranteeing the political, administrative and financial independence of local authorities. It provides that the principle of local self-government shall be recognised in domestic legislation and, where practicable, in the constitution. Local authorities are to be elected by universal suffrage, and it is the earliest legal instrument to set out the principle of subsidiarity.

The Charter 
Local authorities, acting within the limits of the law, are to be able to regulate and manage a substantial share of public affairs under their own responsibility in the interests of the local population. The Charter considers that public responsibilities should be exercised preferably by the authorities closest to the citizens, a higher level being considered only when the co-ordination or discharge of duties is impossible or less efficient at the level immediately below. To this end, the Charter sets out the principles concerning the protection of local authorities' boundaries, the existence of adequate administrative structures and resources for the carrying out of their tasks, the conditions under which responsibilities are to be exercised, the financial resources of local authorities and the legal protection of local self-government. It limits the administrative supervision of local authorities' activities to the verification of lawfulness only.

The principles of local self-government contained in the Charter apply to all categories of local authorities. Ratifying states undertake to consider themselves bound by at least twenty paragraphs of Part I of the Charter, including at least ten from among the following:

 Article 2, 
 Article 3, paragraphs 1 and 2, 
 Article 4, paragraphs 1, 2 and 4, 
 Article 5, 
 Article 7, paragraph 1, 
 Article 8, paragraph 2, 
 Article 9, paragraphs 1, 2 and 3, 
 Article 10, paragraph 1, 
 Article 11.

In 2009, a protocol to the Charter (on the right to participate in the affairs of a local authority) was adopted. It entered into force on 1 June 2012.

The Congress of Local and Regional Authorities has developed a database named "Carta-Monitor". This database provides access to the analysis, article by article, carried out during the Congress' monitoring missions in the 46 Member States. It also allows for comparative analysis on several articles and countries, as well as statistical research on ratifications of articles and compliance with their implementation.

Every report on the application of the Charter in member states or the local elections that the Congress has observed can be consulted on the Congress' web site.

Group of Independent Experts on the European Charter
The Council of Europe has constituted a consultative body called the Group of Independent Experts on the European Charter, consisting of senior academics. The Group meets twice a year to consider a range of matters related to the European Charter of Local Self-Government, and it also provides legal advice and support to the elected members of the Congress of the Council of Europe who undertake a programme of missions to monitor the situation of local and regional democracy in member states of the Council.

The Group is currently considering, through a working group, the question of the possible revision of the Charter, in liaison with the Secretariat and the Rapporteur of the Congress.

References

External links 

 Full text of the European Charter of Local Self-Government
 Table of signatures and ratifications
 Explanatory Report
 Official website of the Congress of the Council of Europe
 Congress' web page for the Charter
 Carta-Monitor: Database of the Charter Monitoring
 List of the Monitoring and Observation reports on the Congress' web site
 Group of Independent Experts on the European Charter

Council of Europe treaties
Autonomy
Local government
Treaties concluded in 1985
Treaties entered into force in 1988
Congress of the Council of Europe
Treaties of Albania
Treaties of Andorra
Treaties of Armenia
Treaties of Austria
Treaties of Azerbaijan
Treaties of Belgium
Treaties of Bosnia and Herzegovina
Treaties of Bulgaria
Treaties of Croatia
Treaties of Cyprus
Treaties of the Czech Republic
Treaties of Denmark
Treaties of Estonia
Treaties of Finland
Treaties of France
Treaties of Georgia (country)
Treaties of West Germany
Treaties of Greece
Treaties of Hungary
Treaties of Iceland
Treaties of Ireland
Treaties of Italy
Treaties of Latvia
Treaties of Liechtenstein
Treaties of Lithuania
Treaties of Luxembourg
Treaties of Malta
Treaties of Moldova
Treaties of Monaco
Treaties of Montenegro
Treaties of the Netherlands
Treaties of Norway
Treaties of Poland
Treaties of Portugal
Treaties of Romania
Treaties of San Marino
Treaties of Serbia
Treaties of Slovakia
Treaties of Slovenia
Treaties of Spain
Treaties of Sweden
Treaties of Switzerland
Treaties of North Macedonia
Treaties of Turkey
Treaties of Ukraine
Treaties of the United Kingdom
1985 in France